Rover's Return is the fourth studio album from English musician John Waite, which was released by EMI in 1987.

Background
Rover's Return reached No. 77 on the US Billboard 200 and remained in the charts for twelve weeks. Two singles were released from the album, "These Times Are Hard for Lovers", co-written with Desmond Child, and "Don't Lose Any Sleep", written by Diane Warren. "These Times Are Hard for Lovers" peaked at No. 53 on the Billboard Hot 100 and "Don't Lose Any Sleep" reached No. 81.

Recording
The album was largely recorded and mixed at Right Track Studios in New York City, with additional recording at The Hit Factory, The Power Station and Carriage House Studios.

During the sessions for Rover's Return, Waite recorded a version of the Billy Steinberg and Tom Kelly song "I Drove All Night". but decided not to release it. The song was also recorded by Roy Orbison in 1987 but his was not released until 1992, by which time Cyndi Lauper had her hit version in 1989. In 2001, Waite's recording was released on the One Way Records release Live & Rare Tracks.

Release
Rover's Return was released via EMI America on vinyl, cassette and CD. It was released in the US, Canada, UK, and Europe. On 25 June 2012, the British label BGO Records digitally remastered the album and re-issued it in the UK.

Critical reception

In a retrospective review, Stephen Thomas Erlewine of AllMusic wrote, "Rover's Return is an attempt to bring Waite back to the top of the charts that just doesn't work. That's not to say that the record is a complete failure, because there are portions that work quite well - the surging opener "These Times Are Hard for Lovers" is good radio rock, and Waite's voice always sounds good in this polished setting. Still, it's a little stiff and predictable, never quite reaching a level that's interesting, either as a period artifact or a piece of professional craft."

Track listing

Personnel 
 John Waite – lead vocals
 Chuck Kentis – keyboards, synthesizers
 Gregg Mangiafico – keyboards, synthesizers
 Tommy Mandel – keyboards, synthesizers
 Arthur Stead – keyboards, synthesizers
 John McCurry – electric guitars, acoustic guitar
 Gary Myrick – guitars (9)
 John K (John James Kumnick) – bass 
 John Regan – bass
 Mike Braun – drums 
 Anton Fig – drums 
 Thommy Price – drums
 Jimmy Bralower – drum programming
 Elaine Caswell – backing vocals 
 Desmond Child – backing vocals 
 Diana Grasselli – backing vocals 
 Patty Forbes – backing vocals
 Louie Marlino – backing vocals 
 Ellen Shipley – backing vocals 
 Joe Lynn Turner – backing vocals
 Myriam Valle – backing vocals
 Maria Vidal – backing vocals 
 Diane Warren – backing vocals

Production 
 John Waite – producer
 Frank Filipetti – producer, recording, mixing 
 Desmond Child – producer (1)
 Rick Nowels – producer (6, 7)
 Dave Dale – additional engineer 
 Michael Frondelli – additional engineer 
 Bradshaw Leigh – additional engineer 
 Tom Lord-Alge – additional engineer
 Phil Magnotti – additional engineer
 Billy Miranda  – additional engineer, assistant engineer 
 Arthur Payson – additional engineer
 Debi Cornish – assistant engineer 
 Mark Cobrin – assistant engineer
 Jay Healy – assistant engineer 
 Peter Hefter – assistant engineer 
 Tim Kramer – assistant engineer 
 Tim Leitner – assistant engineer
 Scott Mabuchi – assistant engineer
 Dan Mormando – assistant engineer
 Don Rodenbach – assistant engineer
 Craig Vogel – assistant engineer
 Paul D. Spriggs – production coordinator
 Trevor Key – photography
 Henry Marquez – art direction 
 Norman Moore – art direction 
 Richard Duardo – artwork (silkscreen print)

Charts

References

1987 albums
EMI America Records albums
John Waite albums
Albums produced by Rick Nowels